Bulakavas Manor is a former residential manor in Bulotiškė village, Lazdijai District Municipality, Lithuania.

References

Manor houses in Lithuania
Classicism architecture in Lithuania